Henry Calver Francis (16 December 1826 — 16 May 1866) was an English first-class cricketer and umpire.

Francis was born in December 1826 at Southwold, Suffolk. He was a prominent figure in Cambridgeshire cricket between 1849 and 1862, making his debut in first-class cricket for a Cambridgeshire representative side in 1849 against Cambridge University at Fenner's. He featured intermittently for Cambridgeshire sides in first-class cricket until 1862, making seven appearances. Playing as a batsman, he scored 218 runs at an average of 24.22, with one century, a score of 114, which came against Cambridge University in 1857. In addition to playing, Francis also stood as an umpire in a first-class match between Cambridgeshire and Surrey in 1862. Francis died at Godmanchester in May 1866.

References

External links

1826 births
1866 deaths
People from Southwold
English cricketers
Cambridge Town Club cricketers
English cricket umpires